Inako Station is the name of two train stations in Japan:

 Inako Station (Mie) (依那古駅)
 Inako Station (Shizuoka) (稲子駅)